Oliver Beene is an American sitcom that premiered on Fox on March 9, 2003. The show was created by Howard Gewirtz. Set in 1962 and 1963, the show chronicled the trials and tribulations of the 11-to-12-year-old Oliver Beene (played by Grant Rosenmeyer), in first person perspective. Oliver Beene'''s other main characters are his parents Jerry and Charlotte Beene, his older brother Ted Beene, and his two friends Joyce and Michael. The narrator, an older Oliver reflecting on his experience, is voiced by David Cross. Often in episodes, the story is interrupted by flashbacks and flash-forwards.

Premise
Oliver (born c. 1951), attempts to sustain normality in an often unpredictable family. Oliver's father Jerry spends his days drilling teeth as a dentist, while his mother attempts to play the traditional homemaker. Oliver's brother, Ted is a sports nut and a womanizer. Oliver's life is often made more bearable with friends Michael, Joyce and his crush Bonnie, who appears at his most embarrassing moments. Both brothers have a crush on a Swedish girl in their apartment building, Elke.

Cast

Main
 Grant Rosenmeyer as Oliver David Beene
 David Cross as future Oliver David Beene (voice only)
 Grant Shaud as Dr. Jeremiah "Jerry" Beene
 Wendy Makkena as Charlotte Caroline Beene
 Andrew Lawrence as Tayler "Ted" Mark Beene
 Daveigh Chase as Joyce
 Taylor Emerson as Michael

Recurring
 Ben Bookbinder as Neal
 Annie Korzen as Mrs. Heller
 Maggie Grace as Elke
 Amanda Michalka as Bonnie

Broadcast history

Episodes
The series first aired on March 9, 2003, as a Fox program to replace the animated series Futurama''. The first season was relatively successful, and the show was brought back for a second season. However, poor ratings throughout the second season led to the show's cancellation in September 2004, with the two last episodes of the season being left unaired in America. (the last episode to air in the show's original timeslot was broadcast on September 12, 2004). In the UK and Ireland, Sky One broadcast both seasons, in their entirety. In Germany, Das Erste HD broadcast both seasons, in their entirety, twice, once in 2006, and once in 2010, dubbed in German. In The Czech Republic, ČT1 broadcast both seasons, in their entirety, dubbed in Czech.

Season 1: 2003

Season 2: 2004

References

External links 
 
Oliver Beene at amblin.com

2000s American single-camera sitcoms
2000s American teen sitcoms
2003 American television series debuts
2004 American television series endings
English-language television shows
Fox Broadcasting Company original programming
Television series about children
Television series by Steven Levitan Productions
Television series by DreamWorks Television
Television series by 20th Century Fox Television
Television series set in 1962
Television series set in 1963
Television shows set in New York City